The 1954 Rice Owls football team represented Rice University during the 1954 college football season. The Owls were led by 15th-year head coach Jess Neely and played their home games at Rice Stadium in Houston, Texas. They competed as members of the Southwest Conference, finishing tied for third. Rice finished the regular season with a record of 7–3 overall, and were ranked 19th in the final AP Poll.

Schedule

References

Rice
Rice Owls football seasons
Rice Owls football